The Concerto for Clarinet, Viola, and Orchestra in E minor, Op. 88, by Max Bruch was composed in 1911 for his son, Max Felix Bruch, and received its first performance in 1912, with Willy Hess (viola) and the composer's son Max Felix Bruch (clarinet) as the soloists.  It consists of three movements:

 Andante con moto
 Allegro moderato
 Allegro molto

The work is sometimes arranged and performed as a concerto for violin and viola.  A typical performance lasts approximately 20 minutes.

It premiered on 5 March 1912.

Recordings
Bruch: Concerto for Clarinet, Viola, and Orchestra; Eight Pieces for Clarinet, Viola, and Piano; Schumann: Märchenerzählungen / Tommaso Placidi (cond.), Steven Kanoff, Paul Coletti, Hanover Radio Philharmonic / 2005 / Asv Living Era
The Clarinet in Concert / Alun Francis (cond.), Thea King, Nobuko Imai, London Symphony Orchestra / 1997 / Hyperion
Bruch: Works for Clarinet and Viola; Concerto for Clarinet, Viola and Orchestra in E Minor; Eight Pieces for Clarinet, Viola and Piano; Romance for Viola and orchestra in F Major / Paul Meyer, Gérard Caussé, François-René Duchâble (piano), Kent Nagano (cond.) / 1988-1989/ Apex
In the Borderland of Romanticism / Mats Liljefors (cond.), Dimitri Ashkenazy, Anton Kholodenko, The Baltic Symphony Orchestra / 1996 / Artemis

References
Double Concerto for Clarinet/Violin, Viola and Orchestra- Date: completed November-December 1911, Friedenau (autograph MS); First Performance: 5 March 1912, Wilhelmshaven; Willy Hess (viola), Max Felix Bruch (clarinet) www.wooster.edu, via web.archive.org

External links
 

Concertos by Max Bruch
Bruch
Bruch
Bruch
1911 compositions
Compositions in E minor